Eamon James McEneaney (December 23, 1954 – September 11, 2001) was an All-American lacrosse player at Cornell University from 1975 to 1977 and later an employee of Cantor Fitzgerald who died during the September 11 attacks.

Lacrosse career
McEneaney teamed with Mike French and Dan Mackesey to win the 1976 NCAA Championship, a key part of Cornell teams which won 29 straight games and two straight titles over two seasons.

McEneaney was voted the outstanding player in the 1977 NCAA Championship game, while setting an NCAA tournament record with 25 points in three tournament games, with 11 goals and 14 assists, one of the great lacrosse finals performances.

McEneaney represented the United States in the 1978 World Lacrosse Championships.

McEneaney was inducted into the Cornell Sports Hall of Fame in 1982. He was inducted into the National Lacrosse Hall of Fame in 1992.

McEneaney's jersey number (#10) was retired by Cornell University on April 27, 2002, in tribute to him.

Cornell University lacrosse statistics
Statistics per Cornell University media guides

 (a) 5th in NCAA career assists per game
 (b) 14th in NCAA career points per game

Writer and poet
Known for his athletic talents, McEneaney was also a poet and had desires to write a novel. His family, in partnership with the Cornell University Library, published a posthumous collection of his poetry entitled A Bend in the Road.

In 2010, Eamon's widow Bonnie published Messages: Signs, Visits, and Premonitions from Loved Ones Lost on 9/11, a collection of stories regarding people who have had supernatural experiences with friends and family members who died during the September 11 attacks.

Death and legacy

At the National 9/11 Memorial, McEneaney is memorialized at the North Pool, on Panel N-57, alongside other employees of Cantor Fitzgerald killed in the September 11 attacks.

See also
Cornell Big Red men's lacrosse
National Lacrosse Hall of Fame
NCAA Men's Division I Lacrosse Records

References

External links

Awards

1954 births
2001 deaths
Lacrosse forwards
Cornell Big Red men's lacrosse players
Victims of the September 11 attacks
American terrorism victims
American lacrosse players
Terrorism deaths in New York (state)
1976 in lacrosse
People from Elmont, New York
People murdered in New York City
Male murder victims
21st-century American poets
Cantor Fitzgerald